The Forgotten City is a mystery adventure role-playing game developed by Australian developer Modern Storyteller and published by Dear Villagers with additional support from Film Victoria. It is a full video game adaptation of the critically-acclaimed The Elder Scrolls V: Skyrim mod of the same name. Initially released in 2015 as a mod, the full game was released in July 2021 for Microsoft Windows, PlayStation 4, PlayStation 5, Xbox One, and Xbox Series X/S. A cloud-based version launched in September 2021 for the Nintendo Switch, with another being released in July 2022 for Google Stadia.

Plot 
In both the full 2021 game and the 2015 mod, the story of The Forgotten City explores the existential relationship between humanity and its laws.

The full game begins with the protagonist waking after being rescued from floating down the Tiber River in Italy. The mysterious individual who rescues the player character asks them to look for her friend, who had disappeared whilst investigating nearby ruins. As the player explores said ruins, they are sent towards the era of the Roman Empire in the now-restored city. As the plot progresses and the player continues exploring it is elaborated that the city is under the protection of gods, where if anyone is to commit sin, all citizens of the city would be equally punished and turned into gold in a system referred to as the Golden Rule (originally Dwarves' Law). These gold statues, depicting previous inhabitants and residents, can be heard whispering, but seemingly only by the player. The specific sins that are criteria for the Golden Rule to be enacted are not clear to any resident of the city, with numerous records of contradictions. The player is able to re-enter the portal they had entered from and restart the time loop if the Golden Rule is ever enacted, allowing them to keep both physical and mental objects such as important items and information.

The plot was significantly altered from its original story in the mod, with the setting of a Dwemer ruin being shifted towards that of ancient Rome as well as much of the script being updated and rewritten. Multiple endings were both added and expanded from the original story.

Each character in the game has a strong background story and argument, complicating the decisions players make in the game. In the future, the developer plans to provide expansion through mods.

Development 
The long development progress of The Forgotten City, spearheaded by lead developer and writer Nick Pearce, began from the beginning of Skyrims release in 2011. Prior to this, Pearce has stated that his inspiration for creating mods came back from his experience with mods from Fallout: New Vegas, specifically New Vegas Bounties by Someguy2000. The Forgotten City took over 1700 hours for Pearce to develop, and was his first ever major development project. The mod later released on console releases of The Elder Scrolls V: Skyrim: Special Edition, remaining one of the top Xbox One mods for the game.

In 2016, after the release of the mod, Pearce quit his day job and hired several other developers to form Modern Storyteller. The resulting development process took four and a half years, characterised by harsh development conditions, with Pearce working 80-hour weeks to the point of hallucination to avoid crunching fellow developers. In the process, the original mod was entirely overhauled; the standalone game was developed using Unreal Engine 4, the setting was changed and numerous features were added, such as professional voice acting, new gameplay mechanics and an original orchestral score. Additionally, the original script doubled in length from roughly 35,000 words to over 80,000.

Reception 

Both the mod and the full video game received critical acclaim upon release, itself being one of the first video game mods to receive any official accolades outside of the modding community, specifically being awarded by the Australian Writers' Guild. The mod had garnered large success within the modding community, remaining one of the top mods for the game and becoming one of the most curated items on Mod DB itself.

IGN awarded the game a 9/10 stating: "The Forgotten City does a fabulous job exploring interesting moral quandaries through excellently written dialogue and characters." Luke Holland of The Guardian gave it 4/5 stars, writing that despite minor technical issues, "The Forgotten City is a tremendous achievement, a labyrinthine little sandbox packed with interpersonal mysteries", which "unravel further and further with each pass." TouchArcade liked the characters and themes of the title, saying "The game has a lot of points to make about morality, and it never feels like it’s preaching. Rather, it comes off like a thoughtful examination of assumptions". While mentioning that it could be "janky" at moments, Nintendo Life praised the pacing of The Forgotten City, saying it "doesn't overstay its welcome" and it had "the right amount of scope".

Rock Paper Shotgun enjoyed the writing, but criticized how the player talked to characters, "when you go up to someone to interact, it then cuts to a view of their upper body, with a pause while they turn to face you or settle into their talking pose. It's only a couple of seconds, but it's a couple of seconds every. Single. Time." GameSpot liked the progression the player had within the loop, writing, "It's satisfying the first time you find these solutions, but even more so when you see how each one acts as a piece of the larger puzzle, opening new avenues for you to investigate in the process." Eurogamer praised the connections each individual mystery had to each other "The time loop itself leads to some wonderful stuff, though, linking itself into puzzles in ingenious ways". PC Gamer liked the way the player could bend the game's morality system, but criticized the combat as clunky and uninteresting, saying there was a "sequence where I had to skulk through a ruined palace filled with creepy animated statues... It was chilling at first, but those weird statues running towards me over and over quickly got repetitive."

Push Square wrote similarly and gave the game 7/10 stars, concluding, "With the interesting time loop mechanic creating further situations full of comedy and intrigue, settling down across a few evenings with The Forgotten City will delight. We just wish the combat was either improved or not there at all, and the technical setbacks weren't quite so rampant." Game Informer felt that "The Forgotten City does a great job making you feel like a skillful sleuth, pushing you to run across town with sizzling leads," but criticized how the janky character movements and facial expressions prevented the player from being able to deduce vital information. Adventure Gamers gave the title 5/5 stars, and called it "a truly excellent mystery adventure", writing, "...[The Forgotten City] gives you the freedom to investigate, explore and make choices on your own terms, while the quality of the script will have you fully invested in getting to the bottom of the Golden Rule breaker," but criticized the overabundance of backtracking.

Accolades 

|-
! scope="row" rowspan="2" style="text-align:center;" | 2015
| Skyrim Nexus
| File of the Month, October
| The Forgotten City
| 
|
|-
| Mod DB
| Mod of the Year
| The Forgotten City
| 
|
|-
! scope="row" rowspan="1" style="text-align:center;" | 2016
| Australian Writers' Guild
| Best Interactive Media
| Nick Pearce for The Forgotten City
| 
|
|-
! scope="row" rowspan="3" style="text-align:center;" | 2021
| Australian Game Developer Awards
| Excellence in Narrative
| The Forgotten City
| 
|
|-
| The Game Awards
| Best Debut Indie
| The Forgotten City
| 
|
|- 
| 25th Annual D.I.C.E. Awards
| Outstanding Achievement in Story
| The Forgotten City
| 
| 
|}

References

External links
 

2015 video games
2021 video games
Adventure games
Cloud-based Nintendo Switch games
Dear Villagers games
The Elder Scrolls mods
Mystery video games
Nintendo Switch games
Open-world video games
PlayStation 4 games
PlayStation 5 games
Single-player video games
Unreal Engine games
Video games about time loops
Video games developed in Australia
Video games set in ancient Rome
Windows games
Xbox One games
Xbox Series X and Series S games